The C-704 is a Chinese anti-ship missile. The missile was developed by the third research institute of the Chinese Aerospace Group, also the manufacturer of the C-701.

Design
This anti-ship missile is designed specifically for targets with displacement between 1,000 tons to 4,000 tons. Neither small anti-ship missiles such as the TL-6 and C-701 nor large ones such as the C-802 and Silkworm missile are cost effective when used for this purpose.

Development
In order to speed up the development and reduce risks, the developer adopted  technologies from the C-701. The resulting new missile appears as an enlarged version of the C-701, with larger warhead. However, a brand new seeker is adopted, it is a centimetre wave radar seeker instead of the television, imaging infrared and millimetre wave radar seekers for the C-701. The C-704 has twice the range of the C-701.

Deployment
Various platforms including aircraft, surface ships/boats, and from land/vehicle. Like the C-701, this missile cannot be launched from submarine yet. The C-704 anti-ship missile can be readily integrated with the current C4I systems such as those for the C-701.

History
The radar seeker armed version is the only version appeared at the sixth Zhuhai airshow, at which the manufacturers confirmed that the development of imaging infrared and television, laser seekers had already been in progress, and like the C-701, the C-704 would eventually become a general-purpose air-to-surface missile that could engage various targets. This would make the C-704 a Chinese equivalent of American AGM-65 E/F/G/J/K Maverick.

On 16 March 2011, Israel Defense Forces allegedly intercepted a shipment of six C-704 missiles with launchers and Kelvin Hughes radar units, along with other munitions aboard the Liberian-flagged cargo vessel Victoria managed by a French shipping company en route from Turkey to Alexandria in international waters by Israeli Navy. The missiles were suspected to be of Iranian origin , being shipped to Hamas in the Gaza Strip for use in attacks on Israeli Naval vessels.

In 2013, Bangladesh Navy corvette  fired four C-704 anti-ship missiles in a domestic naval exercise with all four of them hitting their target successfully.

On 14 September 2016, the Indonesian president witnessed two failed firings of C-705 missiles during a demonstration by the Indonesian Navy. The first missile failed to launch on command but fired unexpectedly five minutes later and didn't hit the target. The second missile fired as expected but failed during flight.

Specifications
Official information on the C-704, released at the sixth Zhuhai airshow in 2006:
Warhead: 130 kg
Speed: High subsonic
Range: 35 km
Cruise altitude: 15–20 metres
Developer: China Aviation Industry Corporation
Kill probability: > 97.7%

C-704KD
The air-to-surface version of the C-704 is first revealed to the public in 7th Zhuhai Airshow in 2008, with KD stands for Kong Di, or Air - Ground. The most significant difference between the original anti-shipping version and the air-to-surface version is in the guidance system. The original radar or IR-UV guidance of the C-704 is replaced a dual band IR seeker, covering both IR windows (3 - 5 um & 8 - 12 um), providing some help against stealth targets, as claimed by the developer.  Other derivatives of the C-704KD revealed at the airshow included yet another electro-optical guided version, which utilizes a gimballed TV and IIR seekers, with the IIR version uses a magnesium fluoride window. Like another development of C-704 revealed at the same airshow, the C-705, C-704KD is also compatible with radar and GPS guidance. The kill probability of C-704KD is quoted at 96% by its developer.

C-705
At the 7th Zhuhai Airshow, another member of the C-70X series is shown to the public. Designated as the C-705, the missile is a direct development of the C-704, yet externally, the new C-705 missile resembles a miniaturized C-602. Major improvements concentrated in following areas: Configuration, propulsion, warhead and guidance. The original rocket engine of the C-704 was replaced with a larger one, plus addition of turbojet engine and retractable wings, increasing the range to 140 km. Developers claimed that the modular design of the new engine had the option to provide a second stage to further increase the range to 170 km, but the second stage was not shown at the airshow.

The warhead is reduced to 110 kg, but the adaption of HVTD-H high-explosive directional warhead enabled the missile to effectively neutralize targets size up to 1,500 tons. Several seekers has already been developed for the C-705, including radar, TV and IR. For mid-course guidance, GPS or GLONASS are used, though the sample shown at the 2008 airshow is only compatible with GPS due to export purpose. Developer claimed that domestic Chinese satellite navigational can also be used. Previously Indonesia was planning on licensed/joint manufacturing the C-705 and installed them on Indonesian design and built KCR type fast attack craft. However because of the poor performance of the missile, the project is halted.

Specifications:
Weight: 320 kg
Warhead: 110 to 130  kg
Range: 140 km to 170 km
Engine: small turbojet engine plus solid rocket booster
Seeker: radar, TV, or IR
Cruise altitude: 12.15 meter (lowest)
Target size: ships up to 1,500 to 3,000 tons
Launching platform: aircraft, surface vessels, and land vehicles
Kill probability: > 95.7%

C-705KD
The radar seeker of the anti-ship version of C-705 is replaced by either a TV seeker or imaging infrared (IIR) seeker on C-705KD. In addition, a data link is also incorporated to enable the operator to change the target after the missile is launched when needed, though the fire-and-forgot mode is still available at the same time. C-705KD and C-705 are interchangeable on the same hardpoint.

Operators

Current operators

Bangladesh Navy: C-704

People's Liberation Army Naval Air Force

Egyptian Navy

Indonesian Navy
 
Iranian navy

Pakistan Air Force

References

C-704

Guided missiles of the People's Republic of China
Air-to-surface missiles
Anti-ship cruise missiles of the People's Republic of China
Military equipment introduced in the 2000s